Second Chance is the first recorded album and the second album overall released by Indonesian alternative rock band Noah after changing their name. It consists of three new songs produced by British producer Steve Lillywhite and nine re-recording of non-studio album songs that Noah recorded under Peterpan name. The album was released on December 31, 2014, by Musica Studios. The album was Reza's last with the group, as he left the band on January 1, 2015. The album was nominated for "Best Pop Album", "Best of the Best Album", and "Best Recording Album Producer" at the 2015 Anugerah Musik Indonesia.

Songs
New songs on this album are "Hero", "Seperti Kemarin", and "Suaru Pikiranku". These are three new songs, produced by the British producer Steve Lillywhite. The remaining nine songs are new arrangements of three songs from Sebuah Nama Sebuah Cerita,  five songs from Ost. Alexandria, and the vocalist Ariel's single that was previously included in Suara Lainnya.

Promotion
This album was only sold in the retail network of Trans Corp., which includes Trans Fashion, Trans F&B (Coffee Bean, Wendy's, Baskin-Robbins), TransVision, Carrefour, Kawasan Trans Studio (Bandung and Makassar), Metro Department Store, and Bank Mega.

As part of the album promotion, Noah held a tour in United States. The tour was originally planned to be held in April 2015. But it ended up being delayed to October 2015.

Singles
Prior to releasing Second Chance, Noah had released two singles from this album in 2014. "Hero" was released as the album's first single via radio airplay in August 6 and via iTunes in August 7. Its music video was released on Musica Studio's YouTube channel in September 22. The second single is "Seperti Kemarin", which was released in November 13 on iTunes and in November 21 via radio. The music video for "Seperti Kemarin" was released after the album's release, on January 7, 2015.

After the album was released, Noah made two music video for two songs from this album: "Menunggumu" (the only old song in this album to receive a music video) and "Suara Pikiranku". The music video for "Menunggumu" was released on June 1, 2015, while the music video for "Suara Pikiranku" was released on September 2, 2015.

Original soundtrack of album
Five songs from the album - "Langit Tak Mendengar", "Tak Bisakah", "Membebaniku", "Dilema Besar", and "Menunggumu" - were used in the soundtrack of the SCTV soap opera GGS (Ganteng Ganteng Serigala) Returns. "Tak Bisakah" is used as the opening and ending theme.

Track listing

Personnel
Additional musicians and production personnel credits is adapted from the album liner notes.

Noah
 Ariel – vocals
 David – keyboard
 Lukman – guitar
 Reza – drum
 Uki – guitar

Additional musician
 Boyi Tondo – bass guitar
 Henry Lamiri – strings

Production personnel
 Ross Hogarth – mixing on track 1–3
 Josep Manurung – engineering, mixing on track 4–6 and 8–12
 Stevan Santoso – mixing on track 7
 Ted Jensen – mastering
 Gita Roni Chandra – Pro Tools editor
 Horas Pinem – engineering
 Madi – engineering
 Toni – engineering
 Teddy Riadi – sound supervisor

Awards and nominations

References

2014 albums
Noah (band) albums
Albums produced by Steve Lillywhite